Sandkorn-Theater  is a theatre in Karlsruhe, Baden-Württemberg, Germany.

Theatres in Baden-Württemberg